Kappa Piscium (κ Piscium) is a solitary, white-hued star in the zodiac constellation of Pisces. It is visible to the naked eye with an apparent visual magnitude of 4.94, forming the southeastern corner of the "Circlet" asterism in Pisces. Based upon a measured annual parallax shift of 21.25 mas as seen from Earth, it is located about 153 light years distant from the Sun. Appearing as a single point in the sky, it is easily split when viewed with a pair of binoculars, and displays three components. Kappa Piscium has an apparent magnitude of 4.87 at maximum brightness and 4.95 at minimum brightness, while the visual companions have apparent magnitudes of 9.96 and 11.20.

The suffix designation indicates it is a "chemically peculiar" Ap star that displays abnormal abundances of silicon, strontium, and chromium. It is an Alpha2 Canum Venaticorum variable with a weak active magnetic field that causes it to fluctuate by 0.01 to 0.1 in magnitude as it rotates. It shows many lines of uranium, and possibly the rare element holmium in its spectrum. Its uranium and osmium content could have been provided by a nearby supernova. Compared to the Sun, it is deficient in oxygen relative to the magnesium abundance.

This star is a candidate member of the AB Doradus moving group, an association of stars with similar ages that share a common heading through space.

Naming

References

Ap stars
Alpha2 Canum Venaticorum variables
Pisces (constellation)
Piscium, Kappa
BD+00 4998
Piscium, 08
220825
115738
8911